This list of bridges in Armenia lists bridges of particular historical, scenic, architectural or engineering interest. Road and railway bridges, viaducts, aqueducts and footbridges are included.

Historical and architectural interest bridges

Major road and railway bridges 
This table presents the structures with greatest spans of Armenia (non-exhaustive list).

See also 

 Transport in Armenia
 Rail transport in Armenia
 Geography of Armenia

Notes and references 
 Notes

 

 Others references

External links 

 
 
 

Armenia
 
Bridges
Bridges